Peltogasterella is a genus of parasitic barnacles in the family Peltogasterellidae. There are at least four described species in Peltogasterella.

Species
These species belong to the genus Peltogasterella:
 Peltogasterella gracilis (Boschma, 1927)
 Peltogasterella sensuru Yoshida, Hirose & Hirose, 2015
 Peltogasterella socialis (Müller, 1863)
 Peltogasterella sulcata (Lilljeborg, 1859)

References

External links

 

Barnacles